Berts bryderier is a diary novel written by Anders Jacobsson and Sören Olsson and originally published in 1995.  

The novel tells the story of Bert Ljung from 25 December to 13 February during the Christmas break and spring term of the 9th grade at school in Sweden.

Book cover 
The book cover depicts Bert, trying to comfort Nadja who is sad, as they both sit on the bed in Bert's untidy room. Below the bed, two eyes watch out.

Plot
Bert tries to retrieve Nadja. The book also focuses on rock lyrics in Swedish, written by Bert for the Heman Hunters, focusing more and more on political and social problems.

During the New Year's nigh, Bert participates at a party in the single family house of classmate Christoffer Palm, as his parents have travelled to the Canary Islands. The party is messy. Bert soon shows interest for Patricia Tivenius. Åke is together with a Celine, a hearing-impaired girl attending the second grade of the Swedish secondary school.

Bert also discovers old Heman Hunters lyrics from the 6th grade, among them Take the Night and Jäh Rocken Roll. When school begins again after the Christmas break, Bert does a review of his class.

Bert also tells the story of when his grandfather's father Vladimir Livanov came to Sweden from Russia a long time ago.

When Bert visits Nadja, her brothers are working or studying. Rolf ("Roffe") is a travelling computer salesman, Ragnar ("Ragge") works as a staff leader at the postal office, while Reinhold is studying at the college to become a doctor.

References 
 Berts bryderier, Rabén & Sjögren, 1995

1995 children's books
Bert books
Sequel novels
Rabén & Sjögren books
1995 Swedish novels